"The Wicked Scheme of Jebal Deeks" was an American television play broadcast by NBC on November 10, 1959, as part of the television series, Ford Startime. It was written by John D. Hess. Franklin Schaffner was the director and producer. Alec Guinness starred as Jebal Deeks and received an Emmy nomination for outstanding single performance by an actor.

Plot
A long-time bank employee, Jebal Deeks (played by Alec Guinness), schemes to ruin the bank. Deeks works his way up the bank hierarchy as he helps the bank through the chaos and is offered the position of bank president. However, a secretary follows Deeks's plan replicates his sabotage, leading him to resign.

Cast
The cast included performances by:

 Alec Guinness as Jebal Deeks
 Henry Jones as Byrnes
 Patricia Barry as Miss Calhoun
 Roland Winters as Fannington
 William Redfield as Bricklow
 Clinton Sundberg as Berry
 Bartlett Robinson as Elliott
 Peter Turgeon as Auditor
 Arthur Hughes as McComb
 Charles White as Auditor #1
 Woodrow Parfrey as Auditor #2
 Albert Linville as Carpovec
 Conrad Bain as The Minister
 William Hickley as The Painter
 Bill McCutcheon as Teller #1
 Ed Preble as Teller #2
 Allen Joseph as Teller #3
 Isabel Price as Miss Morse
 Barbra Lowe as Miss Lee
 David Doyle as The Tailor
 James Reese as The Doctor

Production
The program was broadcast by NBC on November 10, 1959, as part of the television series, Ford Startime. It was written by John D. Hess. Franklin Schaffner was the director and producer. Hubbell Robinson was the executive producer.

Alec Guinness made him American television debut in the production. For his performance, Guinness received both an Emmy nomination for outstanding single performance by an actor and a Sylvania Award nomination for outstanding performance by an actor in a starring role.

Reception
In The New York Times, Jack Gould called it "a wonderful hour of good fun" and "a gentle and hilarious comedy" perfectly tailored to Guinness's style.

UPI television critic Fred Danzig wrote that the role was "a great treat" and for the first two acts had "speed, was light-footed, thoroughly digestible, sportive and saucy." However, Danzig wrote that the third act slowed and lacked theatrical sense in that he believed Deeks could have handled the upstart who replicated his planned chaos.

Associated Press television critic Cynthia Lowry called it "60 minutes of pure delight."

References

1959 television plays
American television films